Take No Prisoners is the fourth studio album by American southern rock band Molly Hatchet, released in 1981. This is the second and last studio album released with lead singer Jimmy Farrar and the last one with original bass player Banner Thomas and the last to feature drummer Bruce Crump until The Deed Is Done. "Respect Me in the Morning" is a duet between Farrar and Joyce "Baby Jean" Kennedy of Mother's Finest. The album is also notable because actress Katey Sagal appears as a backup singer.

Track listing
Side one
"Bloody Reunion" (Jimmy Farrar, Dave Hlubek, Duane Roland, Banner Thomas) – 4:00
"Respect Me in the Morning" (Farrar, Roland) – 3:22
"Long Tall Sally" (Robert Blackwell, Enotris Johnson, Richard Penniman) – 2:56 (Little Richard cover)
"Loss of Control" (Bruce Crump, Roland, Thomas) – 3:31
"All Mine" (Thomas) – 4:00

Side two
"Lady Luck" (Hlubek) – 3:36
"Power Play" (Steve Holland) – 3:50
"Don't Mess Around" (Roland, Thomas) – 3:01
"Don't Leave Me Lonely" (Crump, Holland) – 3:59
"Dead Giveaway" (Hlubek) – 3:28

Personnel
Molly Hatchet
Jimmy Farrar - vocals
Dave Hlubek - guitar, slide guitar
Steve Holland - guitar
Duane Roland - guitar, slide guitar
Banner Thomas - bass
Bruce Crump - drums

Additional musicians
Jai Winding - keyboard
Paulinho da Costa - congas
Tom Werman - percussion
Tower of Power horn section - horns on "Bloody Reunion" and "Lady Luck"
Mindy Sterling, Laurie Bono, Katey Sagal - backing vocals
Joyce 'Baby Jean' Kennedy - additional vocals on "Respect Me in the Morning"

Production
Tom Werman - producer
Gary Ladinsky - engineer, mixing
Cary Pritkin - assistant engineer
George Marino - mastering at Sterling Sound, New York

Charts

Album

Singles

References

Molly Hatchet albums
1981 albums
Albums produced by Tom Werman
Epic Records albums
Albums with cover art by Boris Vallejo